Dziadów Most  is a village in the administrative district of Gmina Dziadowa Kłoda, within Oleśnica County, Lower Silesian Voivodeship, in south-western Poland.

References

Villages in Oleśnica County